Hogood Coffee is a Chinese maker of coffee products. It is the largest domestic instant coffee producer.

Corporate affairs
The company's second largest shareholder is Chongqing Energy International (Hong Kong) Co Ltd., which also established the Chongqing Coffee Exchange, a spot trading center for coffee beans.

History
The company was founded in 2007. It had been a supplier of coffee beans to Nestle before launching its own brand of instant coffee.  Hogood Coffee, launched instant coffee with walnut protein powder instead of non-dairy creamer.

Planting and processing
Hogood plants much of the coffee in its home region of Dehong, one of the 3 primary regions for coffee cultivation in Yunnan. The company contracts farm land from smallholders and plants seedlings, and then re-contracts the land back to farmers to purchase the coffee beans from the farmers at harvest. Due to the smallholdings typical in China, by employing a scheme to consolidate farm lands, productivity is increased. The success of the scheme relies on relaxed land use laws.

The company is investing in a RMB 1 billion (US$145 million) scheduled to be completed in 2018 to produce an announced 10,000 tonnes of freeze-dried coffee, 2,000 tonnes of liquid coffee concentrate and 3,000 tonnes of baked coffee beans annually.

Marketing and exports
Hogood markets its own brand of instant coffee and roasted whole beans. In the domestic market for instant coffee, Nestle dominates with a market share of over 70% while Hogood only held 2.7% in 2014.

Hogood accounts for about half of the country's coffee exports. Since July 2015 the company has shipped coffee to Europe through the Chongqing-Xinjiang-Europe railway link, which passes through Kazakhstan before reaching Duisburg, Germany, taking 14 days over the 30-35 days of the earlier used sea route from Guangzhou.

In popular culture
During a Ministry of Foreign Affairs reception in Beijing in February 2017 to introduce Yunnan to the diplomatic community, Minister of Foreign Affairs Wang Yi praised the company: “The coffee I just drank is called Hogood. I am not exaggerating -- this is the best coffee that I have ever tasted as a globetrotter.”

References

Coffee brands
Drink companies of China
Companies based in Yunnan
Dehong Dai and Jingpo Autonomous Prefecture
Coffee in Asia
Agriculture companies of China